Davidovich Bagels is a bagel brand produced by Davidovich Bakery in New York City.

History
The business was started in 1999 as a wholesaler and primarily sold to repackagers who sold the bagels under their own private label brands. The 2012 collapse of H & H Bagels created an opening within the New York City market. In 2013 the company opened its first retail store in Essex Street Market.

On February 9, 2023 Davidovich was one of five bagels presented to the U.S. Congresses's Bagel Caucus, by NY Representative Dan Goldman, as an example of a "Real Bagel" on National Bagels and Lox Day.

Business 
Davidovich Bagels are certified Kosher and Pareve by OK Kosher Certification.  The company's main bakery is in Woodside, Queens.

See also
 List of brand name breads

References

External links 
 

Food and drink companies based in New York City
Lower East Side
Bagel companies
Brand name breads